A Daughter of the Confederacy is a 1913 American silent film produced by Gene Gauntier Feature Players and distributed by Warner's Features. It was directed by Sidney Olcott with Gene Gauntier and Jack J. Clark in the leading roles.

Cast
 Gene Gauntier as Nan, the Girl Spy
 Jack J. Clark as Captain Allison

Production notes
 The film was shot in Jacksonville, Fla.
 It is the first film produced by Gene Gauntier Feature Players.

External links

 A Daughter of the Confederacy website dedicated to Sidney Olcott

1913 films
1913 short films
1913 drama films
American black-and-white films
American Civil War spy films
Silent American drama films
American silent short films
Films shot in Jacksonville, Florida
Films directed by Sidney Olcott
1910s American films
American drama short films
1910s English-language films